Łoje  is a village in the administrative district of Gmina Sieciechów, within Kozienice County, Masovian Voivodeship, in east-central Poland. 

Number of homes from 1-52.

Geography 

Farming village, situated on the fertile soils of Vistula River. Houses built along the main road that leads to the river bank. 
In 1997 and 2001 high risk of flooding as a result of winding river next to the village.

References

External links
 
 

Villages in Kozienice County